Joseph Watson ( – 23 November 1829) was an English teacher of deaf children, and writer on teaching the deaf.

Life
Watson was educated in Hackney, London at the school of his uncle, Thomas Braidwood, and from 1784 he worked at the school.

In 1792 John Townsend, Henry Thornton, Henry Cox Mason, rector of Bermondsey, and others founded The Asylum for the Deaf and Dumb, financed by public subscription. Watson was also involved in its foundation, and was appointed principal. Originally it was in Grange Road, Bermondsey; in 1809 it moved to Old Kent Road. In 1810 the asylum had 70 pupils, and in 1820 it had 200.

Watson was allowed up to eight private pupils (in addition to his other responsibilities), known as "parlour pupils", who were taught to speak, as well as to use sign language. His parlour pupils included Matthew Burns, a teacher and evangelist who set up his own schools for the deaf, and Francis Maginn, a co-founder of the British Deaf Association.

Watson's system was founded on that of Thomas Braidwood, with some developments and improvements. His book Instruction of the Deaf and Dumb describes his philosophy and his teaching methods. He wrote, "Persons born deaf are, in fact, neither depressed below, nor raised above, the general scale of human nature, as regards their dispositions and powers, either of body or mind." He was opposed to signed versions of spoken language, such as was used in a Paris school. The Abbé Sicard, the French teacher of the deaf, was much interested in his methods, and corresponded with him about the school.

He remained in the office for the rest of his life. He died at the school on 23 November 1829, and was buried at Bermondsey.

Family
His son Thomas James Watson was principal of the school until 1857; Thomas's son James Harrison Watson succeeded him. Joseph Watson's son Alexander Watson (–1865) was an Anglican clergyman.

Publications
Watson was the author of:
 Instruction of the Deaf and Dumb; or a View of the Means by which they may be Taught to Speak and Understand a Language (London, 1810, 2 volumes)
 A First Reading Book for Deaf and Dumb Children (London, 1826)
 A Selection of Verbs and Adjectives, with some other Parts of Speech (London, 1826)

References

1765 births
1829 deaths
Educators of the deaf